Hellinsia angela is a moth of the family Pterophoridae. It is found in Ecuador.

The wingspan is 19 mm. The forewings are shining white and the markings are pale ferruginous. The hindwings and fringes are shining white. Adults are on wing in January, at an altitude of 3,500 m.

Etymology
The species is named after the locality of its occurrence: El Angel.

References

Moths described in 2011
angela
Moths of South America